Apocalyptic Riders is a diptych executed in 1984 and is part of a series begun in 1980 by Nabil Kanso.

Description 
The diptych is oil on 2-piece canvas measuring 2.75 X 4.50 meters (9 X 15 feet).  It depicts two horsemen or as one writer describes "Two wild Knights riding toward each other in an explosion swarming the canvas. They represent the Apocalypse Riders who are also the riders of the war in Lebanon, the artist’s native country."

See also
Apocalyptic Rider
Apocalypse Series

References

External links
Apocalyptic Riders

War paintings
Diptychs
Modern paintings
1984 paintings
Paintings by Nabil Kanso